2020 Scottish Conservative Party leadership election may refer to:
*February 2020 Scottish Conservative Party leadership election
August 2020 Scottish Conservative Party leadership election